K. Jayakumar is an Indian politician. He was elected as a Member of Parliament in Lok Sabha from Thiruvallur Constituency (SC) in 2019. He served as a Member of the Legislative Assembly of Tamil Nadu. He was elected as an Indian National Congress candidate from Namakkal constituency in 2001 and 2006 elections.

Early life 
Jayakumar was born in Pinayoor on 1 March 1950. He earned multiple degrees:  B.E., M.Tech.(Mgt.)., P.G.Dip.RT. & M., P.G.Dip.I.D., (Holland). M.I.E., Ph.D.

Career 
He joined INC in 1976.  He served as Secretary, All India Congress. He was a member of the All India Congress Committee. He served in Tamil Nadu Legislative Assembly from 2001-2006.

College Hockey Team Captain.

Political responsibilities 
 He has been National Secretary of the Indian National Congress For 15 years.
 He has been Member of Legislative Assembly two times(2001–06, 2006–11) in Namakkal.
 Treasurer : Congress Legislative Party – 2001 – 2006
 Leader : Legislative body – 2006 – 2011
 Member: Legislative Level Panel – 2006 – 2011
 Member: Legislative Standing Committee – 2006 – 2011
 Secretary: Tamilnadu Congress – 1998 – 2002

Government Responsibilities 
 Director: National Scheduled Castes Finance and Development Corporation (NSFDC)
 Director: National Insurance Company, Calcutta
 Senior Manager: Import and Export Bank, Mumbai
 Manager: TIDCO Chennai
 Manager: SIPCOT Chennai
 Engineer: National Highway Department, Chennai, HAL Bangalore.

References 

Indian National Congress politicians from Tamil Nadu
Living people
1950 births
Members of the Tamil Nadu Legislative Assembly